Hannah Mary Helen Sexton (21 June 1862 – 12 October 1950), known as Helen Sexton, was an Australian surgeon. After retiring from a surgical career in Melbourne, she opened a field hospital in France during World War I.

Early life and education
Hannah Mary Helen Sexton was born on 21 June 1862 in Melbourne. She was the youngest of five children born to Maria and Daniel Sexton, who had migrated from Limerick, Ireland, in 1854. She attended school in the suburb of Carlton and planned to study medicine, but instead began a Bachelor of Arts at the University of Melbourne because the university's medical school did not admit women. Sexton and a classmate, Lilian Helen Alexander, petitioned the university council over the issue, and in March 1887 the medical school opened its doors to female students.

Career 
Sexton graduated with an MBBS in 1892, making her the third woman graduate from the University of Melbourne's medical school. Since most hospitals were reluctant to hire female doctors, Sexton joined a group of women, led by Constance Stone, who co-founded the Queen Victoria Hospital for Women and Children in 1896. When the hospital opened in 1899, Sexton was appointed the head of surgery, a position she held until 1908. In 1899, she also joined the staff of the Royal Women's Hospital as an honorary gynaecological surgeon; she retired in 1910 due to health problems.

Sexton moved to Europe in 1911. At the outbreak of the First World War, after the British Army declined her offer of medical services, she established a tented field hospital near Paris with financial support from her Australian colleagues. The hospital was recognised by the French government as a military hospital, and Sexton was given the rank of Major within the French Army. Later in the war, she worked at Val-de-Grâce, a military hospital in Paris where doctors mainly performed reconstructive surgery on injured soldiers.

Sexton Street in the Canberra suburb of Cook is named in her honour.

Later life and death 
Sexton returned to Melbourne in 1917 but left for Europe again in 1919, eventually settling in Florence. She suffered from arthritis and Parkinson's disease in her later life, and died in London on 12 October 1950.

References

1862 births
1950 deaths
Australian surgeons
Australian people of Irish descent
Australian women of World War I
Medical doctors from Melbourne
University of Melbourne women
University of Melbourne alumni
Women surgeons
19th-century Australian women
Australian women medical doctors